State Route 204 (SR 204) is a state highway in the U.S. state of California that connects SR 58 and SR 99 in the Bakersfield area. Passing through downtown Bakersfield, SR 204 also connects Bakersfield's three major freeways together (SR 99, SR 58, and SR 178). Only the northern  has been built to freeway standards; the rest is a six-lane arterial road.

All of SR 204 is a part of State Route 99 Business (SR 99 Bus.). The business route continues south of SR 58 to Greenfield en route to SR 99.

Route description

SR 204 begins as a six-lane arterial at SR 58 as Union Avenue. From there, the route travels north on Union Avenue. After intersecting California Avenue, SR 204 crosses underneath the Truxtun Avenue interchange. At the Union Avenue wye intersection, the route heads northwest on Golden State Avenue. It crosses under SR 178 and over the Garces Circle, which provides access to Downtown Bakersfield. The route then crosses F Street, at which point it becomes a four-lane freeway. The route crosses its only numbered interchange at Airport Drive, and then terminates at SR 99.

SR 204 is part of the National Highway System, a network of highways that are considered essential to the country's economy, defense, and mobility by the Federal Highway Administration.

History

Before the 1964 renumbering, State Route 204 was known as Legislative Route 141. It was created in 1933 as a western bypass to Bakersfield via Brundage Lane and Oak Street. At that time, US 99 (defined by the State as Legislative Route 4) ran through Bakersfield via Chester Avenue, and through Oildale (north of Bakersfield) via Roberts Lane. LRN 141 started at the intersection of US 99 (Chester Avenue) and Brundage Lane, where it traveled west to Oak Street. At Oak Street, the route turned north, crossed the Kern River, and terminated at US 99 (Roberts Lane) near Beardsley School in Oildale.

In the mid-1930s, US 99 was moved from Chester Avenue/Roberts Lane to Union Avenue/Golden State Avenue. During the late 1950s, the Union Avenue wye, Truxtun Avenue interchange, and Chester Avenue interchange (with the bridge over Garces Circle) were constructed to improve traffic flow. However, when the US 99 freeway bypass was constructed in 1963, Caltrans decided to use the Oak Street route around the city instead of the Union Avenue route through the city. As a result, the route designations were swapped. The freeway parallel to Oak Street would become US 99. LRN 141 would become the US 99 bypass via Brundage Lane, Union Avenue, and Golden State Avenue. That designation never took effect because in 1964 all of the state highways were renumbered. As a result, LRN 141 became SR 204. Its definition was also simplified to bypass SR 99 via Union Avenue and Golden State Avenue, although that change lengthened the route. In 1978, the route was shortened to connect SR 58 to SR 99 via Union Avenue and Golden State Avenue, which was closer to the original 1963 definition.

Future

Bakersfield has considered several times to convert all or part of SR 204 to a freeway. In 1986, part of the route was considered as the western extension of SR 178. However, that study (which was not a formal route adoption study) recommended another alignment for the freeway. In 2001, Bakersfield’s system study proposed converting all of SR 204 to a freeway as part of the western extension of SR 58. However, that proposal has been dropped in favor of the Westside Parkway connection (known as the Centennial Corridor).

Major intersections

See also

References

External links

California @ AARoads.com - State Route 204
Caltrans: Route 204 highway conditions
California Highways: SR 204

204
204
State Route 204
State Route 204
U.S. Route 99